Priscilla Okyere (born 6 June 1995) is a Ghanaian footballer, who plays as a central midfielder for Turkish club Hatayspor and the Ghana women's national team.

Club career 
She played for Fabulous Ladies F.C. before joining AMPEM DARKOA Ladies F.C

In October 2022, Okyere moved to Turkey, and signed with Hatayspor to play in the 2022–23 Sper League.

Interbayionalcareer 
Okyere competed for Ghana at the 2018 Africa Women Cup of Nations, playing in two matches.

International goals

References 

1995 births
Living people
Women's association football midfielders
Ghanaian women's footballers
People from Brong-Ahafo Region
Ghana women's international footballers
ŽFK Spartak Subotica players
Ghanaian expatriate footballers
Ghanaian expatriate sportspeople in Serbia
Expatriate women's footballers in Serbia
Ghanaian expatriate sportspeople in Spain
Expatriate women's footballers in Spain
Gintra Universitetas players
Ghanaian expatriate women's footballers
Ghanaian expatriate sportspeople in Lithuania
Expatriate women's footballers in Lithuania
Fabulous Ladies F.C. players
Ampem Darkoa Ladies F.C. players
Expatriate women's footballers in Turkey
Ghanaian expatriate sportspeople in Turkey
Turkish Women's Football Super League players
Hatayspor (women's football) players
Ghana Women's Premier League players